Sicera is a genus of moth in the family Gelechiidae. It contains the species Sicera albidella, which is found in Algeria.

References

Gelechiinae